Zhongcun station, is a station of Line 7 of the Guangzhou Metro. It started operations on 28 December 2016.

Station layout

Exits
Zhongcun station currently has four exits, and exit C2 is under construction.

References

Railway stations in China opened in 2016
Guangzhou Metro stations in Panyu District